Terbium(III) bromide (TbBr3) is a crystalline chemical compound.

Production and properties
Terbiun(III) bromide can be produced by heating terbium metal or terbium(III) oxide with ammonium bromide.
 Tb2O3 + 6 NH4Br → 2 TbBr3 + 6 NH3 + 3 H2O

Solution of terbium(III) bromide can crystallize its hexahydrate. When heating it, it will dehydrate and produce some TbOBr.

Terbium(III) bromide is a white solid that soluble in water. It's crystal structure is same as bismuth iodide.

References

Bromides
Terbium compounds
Lanthanide halides